Three Springs is a borough in Huntingdon County, Pennsylvania, United States. The population was 444 at the 2010 census.

The borough takes its name from nearby Three Springs Creek.

History

The narrow-gauge East Broad Top Railroad was constructed through the community in 1874. A small yard and station were located here, and a tank farm and scrap yard were serviced. The tracks have been out of service since 1956 but are still in place and owned by the railroad.

Geography
Three Springs is in southern Huntingdon County, sitting at the base of the south end of Jacks Mountain. Spring Creek and North Spring Branch flow through the borough, joining just southeast of the borough limits to form Three Springs Creek, an east-flowing tributary of Aughwick Creek and part of the Juniata River watershed. Sinking Run, another tributary of Three Springs Creek, flows through the eastern part of the borough.

Pennsylvania Route 994 runs through the center of the borough, leading northeast  to Rockhill and west-northwest  to Entriken.

Demographics

As of the census of 2000, there were 445 people, 200 households, and 127 families residing in the borough. The population density was 357.7 people per square mile (138.6/km²). There were 217 housing units at an average density of 174.4 per square mile (67.6/km²). The racial makeup of the borough was 99.33% White, and 0.67% from two or more races. Hispanic or Latino of any race were 0.45% of the population.

There were 200 households, out of which 23.0% had children under the age of 18 living with them, 52.5% were married couples living together, 7.0% had a female householder with no husband present, and 36.5% were non-families. 31.5% of all households were made up of individuals, and 17.0% had someone living alone who was 65 years of age or older. The average household size was 2.23 and the average family size was 2.76.

In the borough the population was spread out, with 19.8% under the age of 18, 8.3% from 18 to 24, 24.7% from 25 to 44, 24.5% from 45 to 64, and 22.7% who were 65 years of age or older. The median age was 42 years. For every 100 females there were 101.4 males. For every 100 females age 18 and over, there were 93.0 males.

The median income for a household in the borough was $26,167, and the median income for a family was $35,179. Males had a median income of $32,250 versus $22,500 for females. The per capita income for the borough was $15,962. About 5.4% of families and 11.0% of the population were below the poverty line, including 5.9% of those under age 18 and 14.0% of those age 65 or over.

Notable people
 Josh Edgin, pitcher, New York Mets
 Mike Fleck, Pennsylvania State Representative for the 81st District
 James Monroe Miller, U.S. Representative from Kansas

References

Populated places established in 1843
Boroughs in Huntingdon County, Pennsylvania
1843 establishments in Pennsylvania